Mum Bhai is a Hindi-language Indian crime thriller web series. It is directed by Akshay Choubey and produced by Balaji Telefilms. The series features Angad Bedi, Sandeepa Dhar, Sikandar Kher and Sunny Hinduja. It showcases Bhaskar Shetty, a maverick cop and his rise to power. The series was digitally released on both ZEE5 and ALT Balaji on November 12, 2020

Plot 
The story revolves around Bhaskar Shetty (Angad Bedi), who emerges as a top encounter specialist in Mumbai. The series highlights his journey and passion to rule the city on his terms.
Neha Dobi was also in the show.

Cast 
 Angad Bedi as Bhaskar Shetty
 Sandeepa Dhar as Vaishnavi
 Sikandar Kher as Rama Shetty
 Priyank Sharma as Pridhvi
Karmveer Choudhary as Minister Chavan 
 Sunny Hinduja as Zaheer
Sameer Dharmadhikari as Officer Karekar
Madhurima Roy as Ranjana

Episodes

Release 
The series was digitally released on both ZEE5 and ALT Balaji on November 12, 2020.

Reception 
Archika Khurana from Times Of India stated that Angad Bedi's performance in the series makes the gangster sequences more realistic. Udita Jhunjhunwala from Firstpost summed up the series review stating that Angad Bedi's crime series is a beautiful amalgamation of every Indian gangster movie.

Heer Kothari from Free express journal stated that individual acting brilliance of the actors in the series makes it watchable. Pakaoo gave the series a mixed review and highlighted that the series missed a lot of key components.

References 

Hindi-language web series